Jesús Mena Campos (born 28 May 1968 in Gómez Palacio, Durango) is a Mexican former diver.

At his first Olympic Games in 1988 he won a bronze medal in the 10 metre platform event, while also placing seventh in the 3 metre springboard competition.

His final Olympic performance came in 1992 where he placed twelfth in the platform diving. He carried the flag at the opening ceremony of the 1992 Barcelona Games.

References
databaseOlympics
sports-reference

External links

1968 births
Mexican male divers
Divers at the 1988 Summer Olympics
Divers at the 1992 Summer Olympics
Olympic divers of Mexico
Olympic bronze medalists for Mexico
Sportspeople from Durango
People from Gómez Palacio, Durango
Living people
Olympic medalists in diving
Medalists at the 1988 Summer Olympics
Pan American Games silver medalists for Mexico
Pan American Games medalists in diving
Universiade medalists in diving
Divers at the 1991 Pan American Games
Universiade silver medalists for Mexico
Medalists at the 1991 Summer Universiade
Medalists at the 1993 Summer Universiade
Medalists at the 1991 Pan American Games
20th-century Mexican people
21st-century Mexican people